Larrikin Records is a record company founded in 1974 by Warren Fahey. Larrikin started as an independent label and was sold in 1995 to Festival Records.

Artists who have released albums on Larrikin include Eric Bogle, Sirocco, Mike and Michelle Jackson, Bobby McLeod, Kev Carmody, Flying Emus, Robyn Archer, Redgum, Margret RoadKnight, Jeannie Lewis, Mark Atkins, Renée Geyer, Rank Strangers, The Sweets of Sin, Richard Frankland and Currency from Canberra.

See also
 List of record labels

References

External links
Warren Fahey's official website 
Larrikin Records in the website of the National Library of Australia

Australian independent record labels
Record labels established in 1974